Washington Augustus Roebling II  (March 25, 1881 – April 14, 1912) was an American businessman and early automobile manufacturer who perished in the sinking of RMS Titanic.

Early life and education
Born in Trenton, New Jersey in 1881 into the prominent Roebling family of American Industrialists, to Charles (1849–1918) Roebling and Sarah Mahon Ormsby (1856–1887), he was named after his famous uncle, the Civil War officer and supervising engineer for the construction of the Brooklyn Bridge, Washington Roebling. He attended the elite Hill School in Pottstown, Pennsylvania where he was an adept football player. After working with his father in the family business, John A. Roebling Sons Company, he began working with the Walter Automotive Company as its Secretary.

Automotive career
In 1909, Washington Roebling II arranged to take over the Walter Automobile Company from William Walter because of its mounting financial issues. The company was moved to an abandoned brewery owned by the Kuser family in Hamilton, New Jersey, outside of Trenton. Washington Roebling II’s father, Ferdinand Roebling was made President, John Louis Kuser, the twin brother of prominent New Jersey businessman Anthony R. Kuser was made Secretary-Treasurer, and Washington was made General Manager of the new enterprise, Mercer Automobile Company. 

The company marketed itself to the high end and racing markets. He worked with noted French auto designer Etienne Planche, designing the Roebling-Planche Racing Car which performed well in auto races of the time. Roebling tested all Mercer Models before they entered market, and participated in racing. He finished second at the Savannah Trophy Race for Light Cars in November 1911.

Titanic
In early 1912, he took a long European road trip with his friend and Trenton native, Stephen Weart Blackwell and Chauffer Frank Stanley in a Mercer Fiat. While touring Italy and France, Blackwell and Roebling meet the Bonnell and Wick families, and decided to join them on their return trip to United States on the new ocean liner . Because of illness, Frank Stanley stayed behind in Europe with Roebling’s car. Both Blackwell and Roebling stayed in first class accommodations, When the ship struck and iceberg and sank on April 14, 1912, Washing was seen helping the Bonell and Wick family women into a lifeboat, and telling them reassuredly “you will be back with us on the ship soon”. Blackwell and Roebling’s bodies were never found. Because of a miscommunication his Roebling cousins traveled to Halifax believing him to be among the survivors picked up by the RMS Carpathia. The Mercer Motor Company was taken over by outsider investors in 1919, going into receivership in 1925 and folding not long after.

References

1881 births
1912 deaths
Deaths on the RMS Titanic
Roebling family
The Hill School alumni
People from Trenton, New Jersey
American automotive pioneers
Businesspeople from New Jersey